Todd Benjamin Heap (born March 16, 1980) is an American former professional football player who was a tight end for 12 seasons in the National Football League (NFL).

After playing college football for Arizona State University, he was drafted by the Baltimore Ravens in the first round of the 2001 NFL Draft. Heap played ten years for the Ravens, becoming the franchise's all-time leader in touchdown catches and second all-time in receptions and yards. He was released in 2011 and played two years for the Arizona Cardinals.

Early years
A 1998 graduate of Mountain View High School in Mesa, Arizona, Todd lettered three years in football, three years in basketball and two years in baseball. Todd helped Mountain View win back-to-back football state championships in 1996 and 1997, going undefeated both years. He also helped both the basketball and baseball teams win a State Championship his senior year. During his high school years, Todd won many football related awards, including Arizona All-Star honors, All-Arizona, Super All-State, Arizona 5A Player of the Year, Ed Doherty Player of the Year, All-East Valley Two-Way Player of the Year as a senior and a SuperPrep All-American. Todd broke several school records, including most career receiving yards (1,377), most career receptions (87), most career touchdown receptions, and most touchdown catches in one game (3). In the state championship game against Tucson Amphitheater, he caught one touchdown pass, scored a two-point conversion and threw a 26-yard touchdown pass.

College career
Heap played college football at Arizona State University, majoring in pre-business. His 115 receptions broke the school record for tight ends, previously held by Ken Dyer.

 1999: 55 catches for 832 yards with three touchdowns
 2000: 45 catches for 617 yards with three touchdowns

Professional career

Baltimore Ravens
The Baltimore Ravens selected Heap in the first round (31st overall) of the 2001 NFL Draft. Through the end of the 2009 NFL season he played 120 total career games, starting 115.

Heap recorded 16 receptions for 206 yards and one touchdown in his rookie season, playing behind eight-time Pro-Bowler Shannon Sharpe. He became the starting tight end for the Ravens in 2002 after Sharpe left in free agency. The Ravens were 7-9 in Heap's second season. He caught 68 passes for 836 yards and six touchdowns and was voted to his first Pro Bowl. The following season in 2003, Heap garnered 57 receptions for 693 yards and three touchdowns, despite the Ravens having a run-first offense, behind the record breaking 2,066-yard rushing season of Jamal Lewis. Heap was again voted to the Pro Bowl as the Ravens won the AFC North division for the first time. Heap had six receptions for 80 yards and a touchdown in a 20-17 playoff loss to the Tennessee Titans. 

Heap was injured in the second week of the 2004 season, in a game against the Pittsburgh Steelers. He returned in Week 13, but missed the final game of the season. He finished the season with 303 yards and three touchdowns in six games. He returned healthy and ready to play in the 2005 season. The Ravens team suffered numerous injuries to their starters, and ended the season 6-10. Heap caught 75 passes for 855 yards and seven touchdowns.

In 2006 he would begin catching passes from former rival, former Pro Bowl quarterback Steve McNair. It would also prove to be the Ravens best regular season, as they won the AFC North for the second time in franchise history with a record of 13-3. Heap caught 73 passes for 765 yards and six touchdowns. Heap missed 10 games in the 2007 season due to injury, and caught only 23 passes, amassing 239 yards and one touchdown. In 2008, he collected 35 receptions for 403 yards and three touchdowns. The Ravens advanced to the AFC Championship Game for the first time since the 2000 season, but would lose to the Steelers.

Heap played through numerous injuries in the 2009 season, yet had 53 receptions for 593 yards and six touchdowns, and twice scored two touchdowns in a single game. The Ravens finished 9–7, losing in the second round of the playoffs to the Indianapolis Colts. He built on his success from the previous year in 2010, going on to have one of the best seasons of his career. In 12 games, he notched 37 receptions for 546 yards, and five touchdowns, one being a career long 65-yard touchdown. In a Week 13 match-up with the Steelers, he suffered a pulled hamstring on the first offensive snap for Baltimore, taking him out of the game. As a precaution, he missed the next three weeks, not wanting to re-aggravate or worsen the injury.

On July 25, 2011, the day the NFL announced the Collective Bargaining Agreement, the Ravens announced they would be releasing him once free agency began. He was officially released on July 28.

Arizona Cardinals
On July 31, 2011, Heap signed a two-year contract with the Arizona Cardinals. He appeared in 12 games for the Cardinals, totaling 32 receptions for 377 yards and one touchdown. After being injured in a Week 2 game against the New England Patriots on September 16, 2012, late in the third quarter, he did not return for the remaining 11 weeks afterwards and was eventually released by the Cardinals on December 4, 2012.

Retirement
Heap retired from professional football in 2013. On May 13, 2014, the Baltimore Ravens announced Heap would be inducted into the team's Ring of Honor.

In 2017, Heap joined the Ravens' radio broadcast crew, to serve as a color analyst for four regular-season games.

NFL career statistics

Personal life 
Heap and his wife Ashley had five children: daughter Brooklyn (born 2002), twin sons Preston and Kyle (born in 2006), and son Cade (born 2011). Their youngest daughter, Holly Alivia, born in 2013, died in April 2017 when Heap accidentally ran her over in his driveway while moving his vehicle.  In her honor, the Heap family created Hugs from Holly, a campaign that centers around acts of kindness. Every May 4, which was Holly Heap’s birthday, is “Hugs From Holly Day.”

Heap is one of six children. His mother is the cousin of former pro-bowl NFL player Danny White, while his great-uncle Verl played basketball at Arizona State.

Heap is a professed member of the Church of Jesus Christ of Latter-day Saints.

References

1980 births
Living people
Sportspeople from Mesa, Arizona
Latter Day Saints from Arizona
American football tight ends
Arizona State Sun Devils football players
Baltimore Ravens players
Arizona Cardinals players
American Conference Pro Bowl players
National Football League announcers
Baltimore Ravens announcers